Filipp's Bay is a 2006 Russian crime drama television series directed by Aleksandr Tsabadze.

Plot
Filipp Ronin is a former employee of the prosecutor's office, and now the owner of a small company for repair and maintenance of yachts.

By chance, Filipp falls into the epicenter of urban criminal events. Saving his friend, he successfully investigates the murder. And after the investigation, a close friend of Filipp, a lawyer Oswald, invites him to open a private detective agency ...

Cast
Konstantin Khabensky as  Filipp Ronin
Evgeniya Khirivskaya as  Anastasia Gromova
Yaroslav Boyko as  Oswald
Alexander Arsentiev as Igor Poplavsky
Viktoriya Isakova as Oia
Artyom Tkachenko as Konstantin (Kostya)
Denis Yakovlev as Yashka
Farhad Makhmudov as Zoltan
Alexander Rapoport as Poplavsky, Mayor of Sochi
Rafael Mukayev as Luke
Natalia Gatiyatova as Mila Snezhnova
Alexander Shatokhin as Konev
Victor Soloviev as old man
Valentin Varetsky as Gruznov
Oleksiy Gorbunov as Booth
Vladimir Kapustin  policeman Kulyasov
Alexander Sirin as Gromov
Regina Miannik as Katya
Anastasia Tsvetanovic as Lara
Andrey Ilin as Ivin
Irina Lachina as Veronika

Production
Konstantin Khabensky starred in the television series in parallel with the shooting of Day Watch. Valery Todorovsky played an episodic role of a strip club manager. Shooting took place in Gelendzhik and Novorossiysk.

References

External links

Russia-1 original programming
2006 Russian television series debuts
2006 Russian television series endings
2000s Russian television series
Russian crime television series